Gas is a 1940 painting by the American painter Edward Hopper. It depicts an American gas station at the end of a highway.

Creation
The subject was a composite of several gas stations Hopper had visited. According to Hopper's wife, the gas station motif was something he had wanted to paint for a long time. Hopper struggled with the painting. He had begun to produce new paintings at a slower rate than before, and had trouble finding suitable gas stations to paint. Hopper wanted to paint a station with the lights lit above the pumps, but the stations in his area only turned the lights on when it was pitch dark outside, to save energy.

Provenance
The painting belongs to the Museum of Modern Art in New York City.

References

External links
 Presentation at the Museum of Modern Art

1940 paintings
Paintings in the collection of the Museum of Modern Art (New York City)
Paintings by Edward Hopper